The castra of Livezile was a castra in the Roman province of Dacia, located in the north side of the modern commune of Livezile in the historical region of Transylvania, Romania. The fort was erected and surrounded by a ditch in the 2nd century AD. The castra was abandoned in the 3rd century and its ruins are still visible.

See also
List of castra
List of castra in Romania

External links
Roman castra from Romania - Google Maps / Earth

Notes

Roman legionary fortresses in Romania
Roman legionary fortresses in Dacia
Ancient history of Transylvania
Historic monuments in Bistrița-Năsăud County